Hélio de Araújo Vieira (15 November 1914 – 19 May 2003) was a Brazilian fencer. He competed in the team épée event at the 1952 Summer Olympics.

Vieira died in Rio de Janeiro on 19 May 2003, at the age of 88.

References

External links
 

1914 births
2003 deaths
Brazilian male épée fencers
Olympic fencers of Brazil
Fencers at the 1952 Summer Olympics